Miss World USA 1976 was the 15th edition of the Miss World USA pageant and it was held in Boston, Massachusetts and was won by Kimberly Marre Foley of Michigan. She was crowned by outgoing titleholder, Annelise Ilschenko of Ohio. Miller went on to represent the United States at the Miss World 1976 Pageant in London later that year. She did not place at Miss World.

Results

Placements

Special awards

Delegates
The Miss World USA 1976 delegates were:

 Alabama - Althea Henderson
 Arizona - Cynthia Mathewson
 Arkansas - Jacque Ann Wright
 California - Leila Pauschek
 Colorado - Judith Lynn Waltz
 Connecticut - Debbie Carson
 Delaware - Kathy Lynn Shives
 District of Columbia - Rhonda L. Koch
 Florida -  Nanci E. Hirtreiter
 Georgia - Deborah Irene Smith
 Hawaii - Debbie Witthans
 Idaho - Diana Ruth Daly
 Illinois - Laura Jayne Adams
 Indiana - Elaine Fairfield
 Iowa - Mary Ann Goodrich
 Kansas - Jeannie Russell
 Kentucky - Sandy Kay Smith
 Louisiana - Robbie Downing
 Maryland - Amy Whiting
 Massachusetts - Margaret Worral Stockton
 Michigan - Kimberly Marre Foley 
 Minnesota - Cynthia Heather Halcin
 Mississippi - Sandra Alice Baker
 Missouri - Kathy Denton
 Montana - Denise Chester
 Nebraska - Marilyne Joy Buda
 Nevada - Kathy Ann Martz
 New Hampshire - Gina Marie Tomaselli
 New Jersey - Marcee Cooper
 New York - Anneliese Ettrich
 North Carolina - Sharon Denise Smith
 Ohio - Linda Velentine
 Oklahoma - Shawn Robette Cook
 Oregon - Andrea Eileen Jumapao
 Pennsylvania - Juanita Yvonne McCarty
 Rhode Island - Amy Jayne Nachbar
 South Carolina - Sandra Rene Wilson
 South Dakota - Gwen Elizabeth Resick
 Tennessee - Eloise Joy Hendrix
 Texas - Candy Jinnette
 Utah - Marilyn Lenore Sorensen
 Vermont - Susan McCullough
 Virginia - Carolyn Jeanine Curtis
 Washington - Salli Ann Wainwright
 West Virginia - Ludi Chatterton
 Wisconsin - Gail Lynn Burns
 Wyoming - Janet Kim Bates

Notes

Did not Compete

 - Brenda Bacon (disqualified for being over the age limit)

Crossovers
Contestants who competed in other beauty pageants:

Miss USA
1974: : Judith Lynn Waltz (as )
1977: : Juanita Yvonne McCarty (Top 12; as )
1978: : Rhonda L. Koch (as )

Miss America
1974: : Gwen Elizabeth Resick

Mrs. America
1988: : Juanita Yvonne McCarty (1st Runner-Up; as )

References

External links
Miss World Official Website
Miss World America Official Website

1976 in the United States
World America
1976
1976 in Boston